The men's 50 metre freestyle competition at the 2006 Pan Pacific Swimming Championships  took place on August 20 at the Saanich Commonwealth Place.  The last champion was Jason Lezak of US.

This race consisted of one length of the pool in freestyle.

Records
Prior to this competition, the existing world and Pan Pacific records were as follows:

Results
All times are in minutes and seconds.

Heats
The first round was held on August 20, at 10:30.

B Final 
The B final was held on August 20, at 19:07.

A Final 
The A final was held on August 20, at 19:07.

References

2006 Pan Pacific Swimming Championships